was a small, two-metre Apollo near-Earth asteroid that disintegrated in Earth's atmosphere at 21:22 UTC on 11 March 2022, over the Arctic Ocean southwest of the Norwegian island Jan Mayen. A bright flash possibly associated with the event was reported by observers from Northern Iceland.

It was discovered by astronomer Krisztián Sárneczky at Konkoly Observatory's Piszkéstető Station in Mátra Mountains, Hungary about two hours before impact.  is the fifth asteroid discovered before impacting Earth. It was briefly listed on the Minor Planet Center's Near-Earth Object Confirmation Page under the temporary designation Sar2593.

See also 
 Asteroid impact prediction
 Impact event
 
 2014 AA
 2018 LA
 2019 MO
 
 WT1190F

Notes

References

External links 
 2022 EB_5, Daniel W. E. Green, Central Bureau Electronic Telegram, Central Bureau for Astronomical Telegrams, 13 March 2022
 
 
 

20220311

Minor planet object articles (unnumbered)
Predicted impact events
March 2022 events